Synod of the Trinity is an upper judicatory of the Presbyterian Church headquartered in Camp Hill, Pennsylvania. The synod oversees sixteen presbyteries covering all of Pennsylvania, most of West Virginia, and a portion of eastern Ohio.

History 

The Presbyterian Church in the United States of America has its roots in the territory of the Synod of the Trinity, which was founded as the Synod of Philadelphia in 1717 following the division of the Presbytery of Philadelphia into three presbyteries (Philadelphia, New Castle, and Long Island), with the synod as a superior body. After the Presbytery of New Brunswick was expelled from the synod in 1741 during a major division in the church, Jonathan Dickinson left the synod in 1745 to form the Synod of New York. An advocate of the Great Awakening, Dickinson founded a seminary that later became Princeton University. The synod was reunited as the Synod of New York and Philadelphia in 1758. 

By 1851, the synod, then known as the Synod of Philadelphia, was "one of the largest and most influential Synods in the Presbyterian Church, embracing the entire States of Delaware, Maryland, and the greater part of the State of Pennsylvania." By 1881, the synod consisted of nineteen Pennsylvania counties, the City of Philadelphia, and a portion of western Africa. In 1882, the name was changed to the Synod of Pennsylvania. When the General Assembly decided in 1973 to create regional judicatories, the synod was merged with the Synod of West Virginia to form the Synod of Pennsylvania-West Virginia. Finally, when church reunion occurred in 1983, presbyteries in a portion of eastern Ohio were joined to the synod and the name was changed to the Synod of the Trinity.

The Presbyterian Historical Society shows 81 Presbyterian/Reformed historic sites registered within the bounds of the synod.

Presbyteries 

There are sixteen presbyteries in the synod. (map)
 Beaver-Butler
 Carlisle
 Donegal
 Huntingdon
 Kiskiminetas
 Lackawanna
 Lake Erie
 Lehigh
 Northumberland
 Philadelphia
 Pittsburgh
 Presbytery of Redstone Visit website 
 Shenango
 Upper Ohio Valley
 Washington Presbytery  Visit website 
 West Virginia

References

External links 

 
 18th century synod history

Presbyterianism in the United States
History of Pennsylvania
Trinityc
Presbyterianism in West Virginia
Presbyterianism in Pennsylvania
Presbyterianism in Ohio
1717 establishments in Pennsylvania